Muslim Community Center Academy (MCCA) is a Muslim K-12 school in the Chicago metropolitan area and in Illinois. Pre-Kindergarten and elementary school students attend classes in Skokie while secondary grades are in Morton Grove.

History
The school purchased land for a single campus in Morton Grove in 1989. The school described 1989 as its year of establishment. The school began operations in August of the following year. It initially had grades Kindergarten through 2. 25 students were enrolled when the school opened.

At first the school had seven principals before 2002, and that year its enrollment count was 175. In 2002 Habeeb Quadri, the son of the founder of the MCC organization, became the principal. He later became the superintendent.

For a period of time the school had grades K-8 only, partly because since 2004, the government of Morton Grove did not permit the institution to add high school. 

In early 2014 the school had 50 employees and 476 students. In 2014 Skokie School District 68 sold MCC a school building that was previously a private Jewish day school, Solomon Schechter Day School, and the Kenton School. That year MCC moved its elementary school students to that campus.

In 2018 MCCA had 129 students at the middle school level. That year, the Morton Grove government agreed to lift the restrictions on high school students, with new rules allowing up to 25 high school students to enter each year. The high school, MCCA College Prep, opened in 2018 with 11 9th grade students.

In 2020 the school had 740 students.

It also has a hifz program, which had 40 students in 2018.

Campuses
The secondary campus has  of area and includes a mosque and a parking lot that can accommodate over 200 cars.

The elementary campus in Skokie retained the prayer room and a mural reflecting Jewish culture.

Academics
Oakton Community College allows students of MCC at the high school level to take university-level classes.

Athletics
In 2016 a girls' basketball team began to play in the Illinois Elementary School Association's league, making it the only hijab-wearing team.

References

External links
 MCC Academy

Skokie, Illinois
Private K-12 schools in the United States
Private elementary schools in Illinois
Private middle schools in Illinois
Private high schools in Illinois
1989 establishments in Illinois
Educational institutions established in 1989
Morton Grove, Illinois
Islamic schools in Illinois